The Anglican Diocese of Akoko Edo is one of 12 within the Anglican Province of Bendel, itself one of 14 provinces within the Church of Nigeria. The  bishop is Jolly Ehigiator Oyekpen.

Notes

Dioceses of the Province of Bendel
 
Akoko-Edo